The Inkigayo Chart is a music program record chart on Seoul Broadcasting System (SBS) that gives an award to the best-performing single of the week in South Korea. The chart measures digital performance in domestic online music services (55%), social media via YouTube views (30%), album sales (10%), network on-air time (10%), and advanced viewer votes (5%) in its ranking methodology. Beginning on January 24, Inkigayo implemented real-time voting via the Starpass mobile app accounting for an additional 5%.

In 2021, 27 singles ranked number one on the chart and 18 music acts received an award trophy for this feat. Nine songs collected trophies for three weeks and earned a Triple Crown: Twice's "I Can't Stop Me", IU's "Celebrity",  "Lilac"  and "Strawberry Moon", Brave Girls' "Rollin', BTS' "Butter" and "Permission to Dance", Lee Mu-jin's "Traffic Light, and Aespa's "Savage".

Chart history

References 

2021 in South Korean music
South Korea Inkigayo
Lists of number-one songs in South Korea